Scott Elsworth is an Australian Paralympian who competed in boccia at the 1996 Summer Paralympics and the 2000 Summer Paralympics.  He is from New South Wales.  At the 1996 Games, his team finished fifth.  He is a thrower in boccia.  He was coached at the 2000 Games by Joan Stevens. In the period between 1996 and 2000, Elswoth's preparation was hampered because Australia did not compete at many international events.

See also
 Australia at the 1996 Summer Paralympics

References

Bibliography 

 

Paralympic boccia players of Australia
Living people
Year of birth missing (living people)